RPC (Reynolds Porter Chamberlain) is an international commercial law firm headquartered in London, United Kingdom. It is a UK top 50 law firm and has been named Law Firm of the Year three times since 2014, and Best Legal Adviser every year since 2009.  Whilst it has been traditionally known for its particular strength in its insurance practice, the firm has in recent years, through strategic growth and high-profile lateral hires, shifted and diversified its reach and become a more corporate-focused firm.  Known as a “disputes powerhouse”, the firm has a strong reputation for its “hard-hitting” dispute resolution capabilities across a wide range of sectors, often acting for clients in big-ticket commercial and financial litigation.

RPC provides a wide spectrum of legal services to global businesses across a wide range of industry sectors and practices including commercial and banking litigation, construction, corporate/M&A, employment and pensions, engineering and projects, insurance, IP and technology, media, outsourcing, real estate, regulatory, and tax and competition. 

RPC employs around 720 people - including 81 partners and 334 other lawyers. The firm is managed by a Partnership Executive Committee led by the Managing Partner, currently James Miller. The current senior partner is commercial partner Oliver Bray.

RPC has offices in London, Bristol, Singapore and Hong Kong. The firm is the only English member of TerraLex, a global network of legal experts in more than 150 law firms across 100 jurisdictions.

History
The firm can trace its origins back to 1898, when Nathaniel Reynolds set up Hannay & Reynolds with fellow solicitor Alexander Arnold Hannay. This alliance did not last, however, and Reynolds set up as a sole practitioner in 1903 in Arundel Street in the Strand, London. In 1906 his son Hugh joined the practice, which was renamed Reynolds & Son. The firm then continued as Reynolds & Son until 1923, becoming Reynolds & Sons when another son, David Reynolds (admitted in July 1919), joined the firm. With the addition in 1926 of Gerald Thomas Gorst (admitted in March 1924), the firm then continued under various names until 1962: Reynolds Sons & Gorst, Reynolds & Gorst and Reynolds Gorst & Porter (Charles Porter admitted 1935, joined in 1944). In 1962 it became Reynolds Porter & Taylor Jelf. It finally became Reynolds Porter & Co in 1963.

Chamberlain & Co originates from Walter John Chamberlain, who was born on Christmas Day 1869 and was admitted in March 1906 aged 37. For the first year he practised alone in Croydon but then formed Chamberlain & Co in 1907 on moving to No. 1 Stone Buildings, Lincoln's Inn, London. Walter was Mayor of Croydon from 1927 to 1929 and also became Clerk of the Fine Art Trade Guild. His son, Francis Walter Chamberlain, was admitted in December 1913 but did not join the firm until 1919 (presumably after war service). Francis Walter Chamberlain was eventually appointed CBE and sat as a Justice of the Peace and was a Deputy Lord Lieutenant.

The two firms came together in 1971, a year after the death of Walter Chamberlain's son, to become Reynolds Porter Chamberlain & Co. The '& Co' was dropped from the name around ten years later.

Market Reputation 
RPC has a wide-ranging disputes portfolio, and has undergone a remarkable transformation in the past decade particularly on the commercial and banking disputes side. In recent years, the firm has progressively grown its capabilities and practice via both internal promotions and high-profile lateral hires, often from U.S. and silver circle firms. The firm has switched to focus on commercial rather than insurance to seek to compete with silver circle firms, and is regularly involved in big-ticket litigation where the other parties are represented by U.S. and Magic Circle firms. With its relatively nimble structure, the firm adopts a “conflicts-free” model and is able to represent clients in many situations where other international law firms are unable to get involved due to their regular client base. 

RPC’s clients come from a broad range of sectors, from a notable selection of tech giants such as Google and Meta, hedge funds, major European banks and asset managers through to luxury goods, major retailers and high-street brands, publishers and broadcasters.

Apart from disputes, the firm also enjoys a reputation for its capabilities and expertise in non-contentious and transactional work in a diverse range of sectors, such as media and technology.

Main practice areas
Main areas of practice are:

 Commercial Litigation & Arbitration
 Commercial & Regulatory
 Competition
 Construction, Engineering & Projects
 Corporate/M&A
 Corporate Insurance
 Education
 Employment, Pensions & Incentives
 Financial Disputes
 Insurance & Reinsurance
 Intellectual Property, Technology & Outsourcing
 International Trade
 Marine
 Media
 Professions
 Real Estate & Planning
 Restructuring and Insolvency
 Shipping
 Tax (including Tax Disputes)

Corporate social responsibility
The firm has a Corporate Social Responsibility steering committee that co-ordinates its efforts across the following sectors: workplace, marketplace, environment and community. Other initiatives the firm supports are the Limitless London Mentoring Scheme, the TARGET Chances diversity initiative and the BPP Diversity Access Scheme  The firm is also a member of Stonewall, and Interlaw, both of which are aimed at supporting equality for gay, lesbian and bisexual employees in the workplace.

References

External links
 Official website of Reynolds Porter Chamberlain
 Profile in Chambers and Partners and the Chambers Student Guide
 Profile in The Lawyer

Law firms of the United Kingdom
Companies based in the London Borough of Tower Hamlets
Law firms established in 1898
1898 establishments in England
British companies established in 1898
Foreign law firms with offices in Hong Kong